WYSL (1040 AM) is a commercial radio station licensed to Avon, New York, and serving the Rochester metropolitan area.  It broadcasts a talk radio format and is known as "The Voice of Liberty."  The station is owned by Robert C. Savage under the name "Radio Livingston."

By day, WYSL transmits with 20,000 watts, the second-most-powerful AM station in the Rochester area.  But 1040 AM is a clear channel frequency reserved for Class A WHO in Des Moines.  So at night, to avoid interference, WYSL must greatly reduce its power to 500 watts.  A directional antenna with a four-tower array is used.  Programming is also heard on two FM translators:  W221CL at 92.1 MHz in Rochester and W238DE at 95.5 MHz in Spencerport.

Programming
Weekdays begin with a wake-up talk and information program, Quinn in the Morning hosted by Jim Quinn.  Several nationally syndicated conservative talk shows are also heard, Glenn Beck in late mornings, Dan Bongino in afternoons and Dana Loesch in the evening.  Red Eye Radio from WBAP in Fort Worth is carried overnight.

Weekends are largely paid brokered programming, with shows on health, money, religion, guns and law.  WYSL carries some local high school, college and minor league sports.  Some newscasts from Channel 10 WHEC-TV, the NBC Network affiliate in Rochester, are simulcast on WYSL.  Most hours begin with world and national news from Townhall News.

History

All-News Radio
The WYSL call sign was taken from a radio station in Buffalo.  That station is now WWWS.  Management started the new WYSL in 1987, originally on 1030 kHz.  But that frequency required the station to sign off at sunset.  So the station moved to 1040 kHz, allowing it to broadcast around the clock.

The station began with an all-news radio format, combining local content with news programming from the Associated Press. The all-news format ended in 2006 for a number of reasons. First, the Associated Press discontinued its expanded radio services in July 2005. WYSL replaced the network with CNN Headline News, the only other national commercial all-news outlet available. After that, however, Headline News stopped broadcasting news in the evening, switching to talk and reality shows. This left a large hole in the schedule.

Adding Talk
As a result, WYSL picked up conservative talk hosts Laura Ingraham and Bill O'Reilly, and added Rusty Humphries and Jerry Doyle from the Talk Radio Network in the evening, as it transitioned to a News/Talk outlet.
 
WYSL was affiliated with ABC News Radio and the Wall Street Journal Radio Network, but switched to the Salem Radio Network for newscasts in 2012.  It now airs a different Salem news service, Townhall News.

WYSL increased its daytime power from 2,500 watts to 20,000 watts in November 2006. It operates at reduced power at night to protect clear-channel station WHO in Des Moines, Iowa.

Local Talk Shows
WYSL continued to transition into a full-time talk radio station in 2007. Early in 2007, the station added its first local talk show, hosted by local attorney Bill Nojay, as well as picking up Dennis Miller in the afternoon drive time slot. Jim Bohannon was added for late evenings, while Jim Quinn's syndicated The War Room with Quinn and Rose was picked up in the morning drive, thus eliminating the last "all news" programming block on the station, in October 2007. Nojay's show began syndication in 2008 on WLEA in Hornell as well as on WGVA and its numerous simulcasts in the Finger Lakes.

An FM translator, W221CL, went on the air in early 2010 which covers the city of Rochester and portions of Monroe County. The FM station is branded "FM TALK 92.1 WYSL", which simulcasts WYSL 1040 AM.

Conflict with HD Radio
Owner Robert Savage has been a vocal opponent of HD Radio technology being used on the AM band, saying it causes interference and unnecessary broadcast delay for minimal gain in quality.

He filed a complaint with the Federal Communications Commission over interference caused by WBZ's nighttime HD signal on the adjacent 1030 kHz frequency,

Former Programs
Attorney Bill Nojay hosted a daily hour-long program on WYSL for several years, prior to his election to the New York State Assembly as well as during his tenure in the legislature.  Nojay's show was syndicated across two other radio stations in upstate New York.

Nojay was still hosting the show when he apparently committed suicide in 2016. Nojay's time slot was filled by Shannon Joy for a time.

See also
WHEC-TV
WHAM (main commercial competitor)
CNN Headline News
The Wall Street Journal

References

External links

WYSL-1040 official website

YSL
News and talk radio stations in the United States
Radio stations established in 1987